Serramonte Mall is a . super-regional shopping mall located in Daly City, California. The mall is anchored by Macy's, Dick's Sporting Goods, and Target.

The mall is owned by Capital & Counties and is managed by Jones Lang LaSalle.

History
Serramonte Center was built in 1969 along with the Serramonte Neighborhood Development of Fred and Carl Gellert. The center has been renovated in 1995, 2004 and currently as of 2021. Montgomery Ward was an original anchor. After that chain's closure in 2001, Target replaced it. In 2002, the mall was sold to Capital and Counties USA.
A renovation completed in 2004 has given the main building a Zen feel. It included a koi pond, bamboo landscapes, and plush furniture. Other renovations include the remodeling of the food court seating area and the addition of more food court options. On March 5, 2011, JCPenney opened in the former Mervyn's location on the east side of the mall. From 2014 to 2018, the mall underwent a huge expansion, adding Dick's Sporting Goods, Dave and Busters, Cost Plus World Market, Buy Buy Baby, Ross Dress for Less, T.J. Maxx, Party City, Nordstrom Rack, a new five-floor parking garage, and several smaller businesses. JCPenney closed in 2019 and will soon become a new movie theater. Denny's and Firestone Tires, formerly located near the main mall, have been closed down due to their lease having expired.

Layout
The mall is designed to have the anchors form a + in the center of the mall, with a large hallway leading to smaller shops. The food court is near Dick's Sporting Goods.

Ongoing construction
Currently, the mall has been going under major renovations as part of a major expansion project to modernize the mall for future generations. The interior of the mall is going through remodeling while additional retail is being built around the premises of the mall. As of September 2020, the Grand Court, Target Wing, and Food Court are either being prepared, undergoing, or have been partially renovated.

See also 

Serramonte

References

Shopping malls in San Mateo County, California
Shopping malls in the San Francisco Bay Area
Shopping malls established in 1969
JLL (company)